Attorney General Hill may refer to:

Bridget Hill (politician), Attorney General of Wyoming
Curtis Hill (born 1960s), Attorney General of Indiana
John Hill (Texas politician) (1923–2007), Attorney General of Texas
William U. Hill (born 1948), Attorney General of Wyoming